Biathlon at the 2011 Asian Winter Games was held at Biathlon/Cross-Country Ski Complex in Almaty, Kazakhstan. The seven events were scheduled for January 31 – February 6, 2011.

Schedule

Medalists

Men

Women

Medal table

Participating nations
A total of 38 athletes from 7 nations competed in biathlon at the 2011 Asian Winter Games:

References

Men's Sprint
Men's Pursuit
Men's Individual
Men's Relay
Women's Sprint
Women's Individual
Women's Relay

External links
Official website

 
Asian Winter Games
2011 Asian Winter Games events
2011
2011 Asian Winter Games